Miss Earth 2002, the 2nd edition of the Miss Earth pageant, was held at Folk Arts Theater in Pasay, Philippines on October 20, 2002. In its second year, 53 delegates participated, exceeding the number of contestants in Miss International 2002, thereby becoming the world's third biggest international pageant in terms of number of contestants.

Džejla Glavović of Bosnia & Herzegovina won the title that year, also receiving Miss Talent. However, on May 28, 2003, the Miss Earth Foundation officially dethroned her "due to her failure to comply with the stipulations in her contract." Miss Air (First runner-up) from Kenya, Winfred Omwakwe, took over the position of Miss Earth 2002. Omwakwe was formally crowned as the new Miss Earth 2002 on August 7, 2003 at the Carousel Gardens in Mandaluyong, Philippines.

Results

Placements

Special awards

Order of announcements

Top 10

Top 4

Contestants
List of countries/territories and delegates that participated in Miss Earth 2002:

  - Anjeza Maja
  - Mercedes Apuzzo
  - Ineke Candice Leffers
  - Ramona Ramjit
  - Stéphanie Moreel
  - Susana Valeria Vaca Díez
  - Džejla Glavović
  - Melanie Grace Bennett
  - Nazhla Sofía Abad González
  - Zhang Mei
  - Diana Patricia Botero Ibarra
  - María del Mar Ruiz Carballo
  - Apolena Tůmová
  - Julie Kristen Villumsen
  - Yilda Santana Subervi
  - Ines Gohar
  - Elisa Sandoval Rodríguez
  - Merilin Malmet
  - Elina Hurve
  - Miriam Thiele
  - Beverly Asamoah Jecty
  - Charlene Gaiviso
  - Louise Glover
  - Juliana Patricia Drossou
  - Florecita de Jesús Cobián Azurdia
  - Leslie Paredes Barahona
  - Szilvia Toth
  - Reshmi Ghosh
  - Winnie Adah Omwakwe
  - Jin-ah Lee
  - Mirjeta Zeka
  - Raghida Antoun Farah
  - Pamela Ramachandran
  - Libna Viruega Roldán
  - Nira Gautam
  - Yahoska Maria Cerda Urbina
  - Vanessa Ibiene Ekeke
  - Linn Naimak Olaisen
  - Carolina Lilibeth Miranda Samudio
  - Adriana Raquel Baum Ramos
  - Claudia Ortiz de Zevallos Cano
  - April Rose Lim Perez
  - Agnieszka Portka
  - Deidre Rodríguez
  - Gayathri Unnijkrishan
  - Cristina Carpintero
  - Jade Chang
  - Tausi Abdalla
  - Lalita Apaiwong
  - Martha Semegura Nambajjwe
  - Casey Marie Burns
  - Dagmar Catalina Votterl Peláez
  - Slađana Božović

Notes

Debuts

Withdrawals
During the contest
  – Jurraney Toppenberg walked out during the 2nd week.
  – Adriana Luci de Souza Reis returned home with a kidney infection.
  – Ivana Muciç

Before the contest

International broadcasters

References

External links
 
 Miss Earth Foundation
 Miss Earth Foundation Kids' I Love My Planet
 Nazhla Abad, Miss Earth Chile 2002

2002
2002 in the Philippines
2002 beauty pageants
Beauty pageants in the Philippines